Events from the year 1654 in Denmark.

Incumbents 

 Monarch – Frederick III
 Steward of the Realm – Joachim Gersdorff

Events 
 12 August – Total solar eclipse across large parts of Jutland, Funen and Zealand.
 1 October – Formal diplomatic relations with the United Kingdom begins:  The United Kingdom opens an embassy in Copenhagen. Denmark has an embassy in London.

Undated
John Maurice, Prince of Nassau-Siegen presents Frederick III with a collection of works by Albert Eckhout from Vrazil, comprising eight full-length portraits of local people of varying ethnicity, 12 still lifes of local produce and vegetation and three portraits.

Births 
 28 March – Sophie Amalie Moth, royal mistress (died 1719)
 5 June – Hans Munch, theologian and priest, bishop of Christianssand and of Christiania (died 1712).

Deaths

References 

 
Denmark
Years of the 17th century in Denmark